The rugby sevens at the 2022 Commonwealth Games – Men's tournament was the men's event of the Commonwealth Games rugby sevens competition held every four years. It was held at the Coventry Stadium from 29 to 31 July 2022.

Venue
The tournaments were originally scheduled to take place at Villa Park, but instead took place at the Coventry Stadium in Coventry.

The adjacent Coventry Arena will play host to judo and wrestling.

Qualification 
England qualified as host nation, nine nations qualified via the World Rugby Sevens Series, and six nations booked their places in regional qualification tournaments.

Competition format
On 8 July 2022, the pools' formation was announced. The top two teams in each pool will advance to the medal round knockout stage, and the remaining teams will compete for a ninth to sixteenth place.

Pool stage

Pool A

Pool B

Pool C

Pool D

Knockout stage

Medal place matches

Quarter–finals

Semi–finals

Bronze medal match

Gold medal match

5th–8th placed matches

5–8 Semi-finals

5th Place playoff

Classification bracket

9–16 Quarter-finals

9–12 Semi-finals

9th Place playoff

13th–16th placed matches

13th–16th Semi-finals

13th Place playoff

Final standing

Player statistics

Most points

Most tries

Notes

References

 
2022
Rugby sevens competitions in England
2022 rugby sevens competitions
International rugby union competitions hosted by England